"Come with Me" is a song recorded by the American rapper Puff Daddy, featuring English guitarist Jimmy Page, from the soundtrack to the 1998 film, Godzilla. The song recreates the 1975 Led Zeppelin song "Kashmir". Jimmy Page and producer Tom Morello also supplied live guitar parts (Morello also played bass on the song).  The song also features heavy orchestral elements.

Released as a single on June 9, 1998, "Come with Me" reached number one in Iceland, number two in the United Kingdom, number three in New Zealand, and number four in the United States, and it became a top-five hit in several European countries. A music video, directed by Howard Greenhalgh featuring both Puff Daddy and Jimmy Page, was made for the song.

Charts

Weekly charts

Year-end charts

Certifications

Release history

In popular culture
 Combs and Page performed the song on Saturday Night Live'''s 23rd season finale, hosted by David Duchovny which aired on May 9, 1998.
 In France, the song is played when football club Olympique Marseille scores a goal.
 The song played for New York Yankees shortstop Derek Jeter when he would come up to the plate.
 The song is used as an intro to the final stage in the Italian game show, Avanti un altro!''.
 The song has frequently been played during the popular and historical Swedish ski-race Vasaloppet.

References

External links

1998 singles
Bad Boy Records singles
Epic Records singles
Jimmy Page songs
Led Zeppelin
Music videos directed by Howard Greenhalgh
Number-one singles in Iceland
Sean Combs songs
Songs written by Jimmy Page
Songs written by John Bonham
Songs written by Robert Plant
Songs written by Sean Combs
Songs written for films
Songs about revenge